Tomačevica is a village east of Komen in the Littoral region of Slovenia. According to the 2002 census, it has a population of 160.

References

External links

Tomačevica on Geopedia

Populated places in the Municipality of Komen